Albert Edward Wilshire FRCO LRAM (1863–1935) was an organist and composer based in England.

Life
Wilshire was born in 1863 in Potterne, Wiltshire, the son of Charles Ross Wilshire and Julia Augusta. 
 
He married Christina Gunn on 2 August 1893 in Wroxall. They had the following children:
Christina Wilshire b. 1897
Doreen Martin Wilshire b. 1900

Appointments
Assistant Organist of Salisbury Cathedral 1881 - 1884
Organist of Ilfracombe Parish Church 1887 - 1902
Organist of Wimborne Minster 1902 - 1915

Compositions
His compositions include: 
46th Psalm
The Timbrels Sound (choral march)
Part songs

References

1863 births
1935 deaths
English organists
British male organists
English composers
Fellows of the Royal College of Organists
People from Wiltshire